Poeeessa or Poieessa, or Poeessa or Poiessa (Ποιῆσσα), or Poeassa or Poiassa (Ποιᾶσσα), was a town of ancient Keos, situated on the southwestern side of the island, on a high and steep promontory.
It was founded in the 6th century BC. According to myths the Aeacus founded the city.

Its site is located near the modern Poiesses (Pisses).

References

Populated places in the ancient Aegean islands
Former populated places in Greece
Kea (island)